Medvezhyegorsk is a town and the administrative center of Medvezhyegorsky District of the Republic of Karelia, Russia. Population:    15,800 (1959).

History
A village in this location had existed since the 17th century. Between 1703–1710 and 1766–1769, a factory was operating in the village. Town status was granted to it in 1916, when it was known as Medvezhya Gora (lit. "bear mount"). The current name was given to it in 1938. During World War II, the town was occupied by the Finnish Army from 6 December 1941 to 23 June 1944.

Administrative and municipal status
Within the framework of administrative divisions, Medvezhyegorsk serves as the administrative center of Medvezhyegorsky District, to which it is directly subordinated. As a municipal division, the town of Medvezhyegorsk, together with three rural localities, is incorporated within Medvezhyegorsky Municipal District as Medvezhyegorskoye Urban Settlement.

Transportation
Medvezhyegorsk is on the Murmansk railway south of the White Sea, and at the north end of Lake Onega. The White Sea–Baltic Canal passes by it.

References

Notes

Sources

External links

Unofficial website of Medvezhyegorsk 
"Behind Kirov's Back (Medvezhyegorsk sketches)", by Svetlana Rapenkova, Альманах "Соловецкое море", №6, 2007 

Cities and towns in the Republic of Karelia
Medvezhyegorsky District
Povenetsky Uyezd
Former urban-type settlements of Karelia